Parliamentary elections were held in Poland on 21 March 1976. The results, like with the other elections in communist Poland, were controlled by the communist government. The results of the 1976 election would be duplicated, exactly, by the 1980 election, and were only marginally different from those of the preceding years, and from the 1985 election.

Results

As the other parties and "independents" were subordinate to PZPR, its control of the Sejm was total.

References

1976 in Poland
Parliamentary elections in Poland
Poland
March 1976 events in Europe
Elections in the Polish People's Republic
1976 elections in Poland